A cyclase is an enzyme, almost always a lyase, that catalyzes a chemical reaction to form a cyclic compound. Important cyclase enzymes include:
 Adenylyl cyclase, which forms cyclic AMP from adenosine triphosphate (EC 4.6.1.1)
 ADCY1
 ADCY2
 ADCY3
 ADCY4
 ADCY5
 ADCY6
 ADCY7
 ADCY8
 ADCY9
 ADCY10
 Guanylyl cyclase, which forms cyclic GMP from guanosine triphosphate (EC 4.6.1.2)
 GUCY1A2
 GUCY1A3
 GUCY1B3
 Guanylate cyclase 2C
 Guanylate cyclase 2D
 Guanylate cyclase 2F
 NPR1
 NPR2
 Protein cyclase, a ligase enzyme that produces backbone-cyclised proteins by intramolecular transpeptidation

EC 4.6.1